Y. Austin Chang (1932–2011) was a material engineering researcher and educator. He was  a Wisconsin Distinguished Professor Emeritus, a member of the National Academy of Engineering, a foreign member of the Chinese Academy of Sciences, Fellow of the Minerals, Metals and Materials Society, and Fellow of ASM International.

Chang received his B.S. from University of California, Berkeley, and M.S. degree from University of Washington, Seattle, both in Chemical Engineering. He obtained his Ph.D. in metallurgy from UC-Berkeley.

He had been on the faculty of Materials Science and Engineering at University of Wisconsin–Madison since 1980. He was appointed Wisconsin Distinguished Professor in 1988 and currently the Wisconsin Distinguished Professor Emeritus. He served as chairs of two materials engineering departments at University of Wisconsin–Milwaukee (1971–77) and University of Wisconsin–Madison (1982–91) for a total of 15 years.

He also served as board member, vice president and the 2000 president of TMS, trustee of ASM  and  AIME, the national president of Alpha Sigma Mu and a National Honor Society for students in MS&E.

References

1932 births
2011 deaths
20th-century American engineers
Members of the United States National Academy of Engineering
Foreign members of the Chinese Academy of Sciences
UC Berkeley College of Engineering alumni
University of Washington College of Engineering alumni
University of Wisconsin–Madison faculty
University of Wisconsin–Milwaukee faculty
Scientists from Henan
Engineers from Henan
Chinese emigrants to the United States
Members of Academia Sinica